These are the results of the 2014 Ibero-American Championships in Athletics which took place from August 1 to 3, 2014, at the Estádio Ícaro de Castro Melo in São Paulo, Brazil.

Men's results

100 meters

Heats
Heat 1 – 1 August 16:10h – Temperature: 26.0 °C – Humidity: 50% – Wind: -0.2 m/s 

Heat 2 – 1 August 16:10h – Temperature: 25.5 °C – Humidity: 55% – Wind: +0.2 m/s 

Heat 3 – 1 August 16:10h – Temperature: 25.6 °C – Humidity: 55% – Wind: +0.3 m/s 

Final – 1 August 17:55h – Temperature: 24.0 °C – Humidity: 35% – Wind: +0.6 m/s

200 meters

Heats
Heat 1 – 2 August 15:50h – Temperature: 28.0 °C – Humidity: 25% – Wind: -1.5 m/s 

Heat 2 – 2 August 15:50h – Temperature: 28.0 °C – Humidity: 25% – Wind: -2.3 m/s 

Final – 3 August 10:20h – Temperature: 25.6 °C – Humidity: 45% – Wind: +0.7 m/s

400 meters
Final – 2 August 16:25h – Temperature: 24.9 °C – Humidity: 36%

800 meters
Final – 2 August 17:30h – Temperature: 24.0 °C – Humidity: 34%

1500 meters
Final – 3 August 15:50h – Temperature: 28 °C – Humidity: 38%

3000 meters
Final – 1 August 17:20h – Temperature: 27.0 °C – Humidity: 32%

5000 meters
Final – 3 August 09:30h – Temperature: 25.6 °C – Humidity: 45%

3000 meters steeplechase
Final – 1 August 16:45h – Temperature: 27.0 °C – Humidity: 32%

110 meters hurdles

Heats
Heat 1 – 2 August 10:00h – Temperature: 21.8 °C – Humidity: 63% – Wind: -1.5 m/s 

Heat 2 – 2 August 10:00h – Temperature: 23.1° – Humidity: 63% – Wind: +1.2 m/s 

Final – 2 August 18:30h – Temperature: 21.5 °C – Humidity: 51% – Wind: -0.3 m/s

400 meters hurdles

Heats
Heat 1 – 1 August 15:30h – Temperature: 25.5 °C – Humidity: 50%

Heat 2 – 1 August 15:30h – Temperature: 25.5 °C – Humidity: 55%

Final – 2 August 17:00h – Temperature: 23.9 °C – Humidity: 36%

High jump
Final – 3 August 15:05h – Temperature: 27.5–27.4 °C – Humidity: 23 - 20%

Pole vault
Final – 3 August 09:05h – Temperature: 19.3–22.6 °C – Humidity: 70 - 55%

Long jump
Final – 2 August 15:20h – Temperature: 26.4–24.9 °C – Humidity: 28 - 36%

Triple jump
Final – 3 August 15:10h – Temperature: 27.3–26.9 °C – Humidity: 24 - 24%

Shot put
Final – 3 August 15:35h – Temperature: 28.3–28.3 °C – Humidity: 20 - 20%

Discus throw
Final – 2 August 19:00h – Temperature: 20.1–17.1 °C – Humidity: 59 - 72%

Hammer throw
Final – 1 August 15:40h – Temperature: 27.5–26.9 °C – Humidity: 31 - 32%

Javelin throw
Final – 3 August 16:25h – Temperature: 26.7–25.2 °C – Humidity: 20 - 20%

Decathlon
Final

20,000 meters walk
Final – 2 August 18:50h – Temperature: 17.0 °C – Humidity: 71%

4 x 100 meters relay
Final – 3 August 16:50h – Temperature: 26.9 °C – Humidity: 24%

4 x 400 meters relay
Final – 3 August 11:20h – Temperature: 25.2 °C – Humidity: 47%

Women's results

100 meters
Final – 1 August 17:40h – Temperature: 25.0 °C – Humidity: 35% – Wind: +0.0 m/s

200 meters

Heats
Heat 1 – 2 August 15:30h – Temperature: 28.0 °C – Humidity: 25% – Wind: -0.7 m/s 

Heat 2 – 2 August 15:30h – Temperature: 28.0 °C – Humidity: 25% – Wind: -0.7 m/s 

Final – 3 August 10:00h – Temperature: 25.6 °C – Humidity: 45% – Wind: +0.2 m/s

400 meters
Final – 2 August 16:10h – Temperature: 28.0 °C – Humidity: 25%

800 meters
Final – 2 August 17:15h – Temperature: 23.9 °C – Humidity: 36%

1500 meters
Final – 3 August 15:30h – Temperature: 30.0 °C – Humidity: 54%

3000 meters
Final – 1 August 17:00h – Temperature: 27.0 °C – Humidity: 32%

5000 meters
Final – 3 August 16:10h – Temperature: 26.9 °C – Humidity: 24%

3000 meters steeplechase
Final – 1 August 16:30h – Temperature: 27.0 °C – Humidity: 32%

100 meters hurdles
Final – 3 August 15:15h – Temperature: 30.0 °C – Humidity: 33% – Wind: +0.1 m/s

400 meters hurdles
Final – 2 August 16:45h – Temperature: 23.9 °C – Humidity: 36%

High jump
Final – 1 August 17:30h – Temperature: 23.5–20.9 °C – Humidity: 41-48%

Pole vault
Final – 1 August 15:45h – Temperature: 27.3–26.1 °C – Humidity: 29- 44%

Long jump
Final – 1 August 16:00h – Temperature: 27.0–23.5 °C – Humidity: 31 - 40%

Triple jump
Final – 2 August 16:55h – Temperature: 22.9–22.1 °C – Humidity: 43 - 51%

Shot put
Final – 3 August 09:10h – Temperature: 19–25.6 °C – Humidity: 69% - 45%

Discus throw
Final – 2 August 15:15h – Temperature: 27.1–25.7 °C – Humidity: 20 - 33%

Hammer throw
Final – 1 August 17:10h – Temperature: 24.1–21.4 °C – Humidity: 42 - 52%

Javelin throw
Final – 3 August 15:00h – Temperature: 29.2–31.1 °C – Humidity: 20 - 20%

Heptathlon
Final

10,000 meters walk
Final – 1 August 18:45h – Temperature: 23.0 °C – Humidity: 35%

4 x 100 meters relay
Final – 3 August 16:30h – Temperature: 26.9 °C – Humidity: 24%

4 x 400 meters relay
Final – 3 August 10:50h – Temperature: 25.2 °C – Humidity: 47%

References
Please visit this link first.  This avoids the "Microsoft OLE DB Provider for SQL Server error '80040e37'", and the results in the reference webpages below will be displayed correctly.

Ibero-American Championships in Athletics
2014